The 2017 Volvo Car Open was a women's tennis event on the 2017 WTA Tour. It took place between April 3 – 9, 2017 and was the 45th edition of the Charleston Open tournament and a Premier level tournament. The event took place at the Family Circle Tennis Center, on Daniel Island, Charleston, United States. It was the only event of the clay court season played on green clay.

Points and prize money

Point distribution

Prize money

Singles main draw entrants

Seeds 

1 Rankings as of March 20, 2017.

Other entrants 
The following players received wildcards into the main draw:
  Hayley Carter (Withdrew due to death of a family) 
  Kayla Day 
  Bethanie Mattek-Sands 

The following players received entry from the qualifying draw:
  Ana Bogdan
  Verónica Cepede Royg 
  Sofia Kenin 
  Aleksandra Krunić 
  Asia Muhammad 
  Anastasia Rodionova 
  Sílvia Soler Espinosa 
  Fanny Stollár

The following players received entry as lucky losers
  Ons Jabeur
  Grace Min

Withdrawals 
Before the tournament
  Alisa Kleybanova →replaced by  Varvara Lepchenko
  Ana Konjuh →replaced by  Maria Sakkari
  Johanna Konta →replaced by  Grace Min
  Peng Shuai →replaced by  Magda Linette
  Yaroslava Shvedova →replaced by  Mona Barthel
  Natalia Vikhlyantseva →replaced by  Sara Errani

Retirements 
  Louisa Chirico
  Kateřina Siniaková
  Fanny Stollár

Doubles main draw entrants

Seeds 

1 Rankings as of March 20, 2017.

Other entrants 
The following pairs received wildcards into the doubles main draw:
  Elizabeth Halbauer /  Sofia Kenin
  Jelena Janković /  Andrea Petkovic

The following pair received entry as alternates:
  Danka Kovinić /  Aleksandra Krunić

Withdrawals 
Before the tournament
  Andrea Petkovic

Champions

Singles 

  Daria Kasatkina def.  Jeļena Ostapenko, 6–3, 6–1

Doubles 

  Bethanie Mattek-Sands /  Lucie Šafářová def.  Lucie Hradecká /  Kateřina Siniaková, 6–1, 4–6, [10–7]

References

External links 
 

2017 WTA Tour
2017 in American tennis
2017 Volvo Car Open
2017 in sports in South Carolina
April 2017 sports events in the United States